A by-election was held for the New South Wales Legislative Assembly electorate of Bathurst on 25 June 1900 when Protectionist party member Francis Suttor was appointed to the Legislative Council.

Dates

Results

Protectionist party member Francis Suttor was appointed to the Legislative Council. William Young, while a member of the Protectionist party was also endorsed by the Labour party. Alfred Thompson, whilst a Free Trader, was nominated by the Ministerialist faction of Sir William Lyne's protectionist government.

See also
Electoral results for the district of Bathurst
List of New South Wales state by-elections

References

1900 elections in Australia
New South Wales state by-elections
1900s in New South Wales